Guy Homer Harding (born December 7, 1925) was an American politician in the state of South Dakota. He was a member of the South Dakota State Senate from 1971 to 1988. Throughout his state senate term, he represented the 19th, 22nd, 23rd, and 24th districts. He was also Treasurer of South Dakota from 1991 to 1995. Harding, a Republican, is a veteran of World War II and Korean War, serving in the US Army. He reached the rank of brigadier general and was later Assistant Adjutant General of South Dakota. He is an alumnus of the University of South Dakota and was a car dealer. Harding is also a past president of the Pierre Chamber of Commerce and former member of the Pierre School Board.

References

Living people
South Dakota Republicans
1925 births
People from Pierre, South Dakota
University of South Dakota alumni
United States Army personnel of World War II
United States Army personnel of the Korean War